Oberteich (German for Upper Pond) may refer to:
German name for the Upper Pond (Kaliningrad), Russia
German name of Stawnica, Warmian-Masurian Voivodeship, Poland
pond in Schönberg, Mecklenburg-Vorpommern, Germany
pond near Stendorfer See, Schleswig-Holstein, Germany

German words and phrases